Qiuchu Julindi, born Su, was the son of Qiufu Youdi. He succeeded Xitong Shizhu Houdi in 63 AD and ruled for only a few months before dying. He was succeeded by his cousin Huxie Shizhu Houti.

Footnotes

References

Bichurin N.Ya., "Collection of information on peoples in Central Asia in ancient times", vol. 1, Sankt Petersburg, 1851, reprint Moscow-Leningrad, 1950

Taskin B.S., "Materials on Sünnu history", Science, Moscow, 1968, p. 31 (In Russian)

Chanyus